The 2018 Rogers Cup presented by National Bank was a tennis tournament to be played on outdoor hard courts. It was the 129th edition (for the men) and the 117th (for the women) of the Canadian Open. The tournament was part of the ATP World Tour Masters 1000 of the 2018 ATP World Tour, and of the WTA Premier 5 tournaments of the 2018 WTA Tour, and was also a 2018 US Open Series event. The men's event was held at the Aviva Centre in Toronto and the women's event was held at the IGA Stadium in Montréal, both from August 6 to August 12.

Points and prize money

Point distribution

Prize money

ATP singles main-draw entrants

Seeds
The following are the seeded players. Seedings are based on ATP rankings as of July 30, 2018. Rankings and points before are as of August 6, 2018.

† The player used an exemption to skip the tournament in 2017. Accordingly, points for his 18th best result are deducted instead.

Withdrawals 
The following players would have been seeded, but they withdrew from the event.

Other entrants
The following players received wild cards into the main singles draw:
  Félix Auger-Aliassime
  Peter Polansky 
  Vasek Pospisil
  Stan Wawrinka

The following players received entry from the singles qualifying draw:
  Evgeny Donskoy 
  Ryan Harrison
  Pierre-Hugues Herbert
  Ilya Ivashka
  Bradley Klahn 
  Daniil Medvedev 
  Yoshihito Nishioka

The following players received entry as lucky losers:
  Mirza Bašić
  Mackenzie McDonald
  Mikhail Youzhny

Withdrawals
Before the tournament
  Roberto Bautista Agut → replaced by  Mackenzie McDonald
  Tomáš Berdych → replaced by  Yūichi Sugita
  Chung Hyeon → replaced by  Mirza Bašić
  Juan Martín del Potro → replaced by  Mikhail Youzhny
  Roger Federer → replaced by  Jérémy Chardy
  Richard Gasquet → replaced by  Matthew Ebden
  Philipp Kohlschreiber → replaced by  Márton Fucsovics
  Leonardo Mayer → replaced by  Benoît Paire
  Gaël Monfils → replaced by  Frances Tiafoe
  Andreas Seppi → replaced by  João Sousa

Retirements
  Yoshihito Nishioka

ATP doubles main-draw entrants

Seeds

 Rankings are as of July 30, 2018

Other entrants
The following pairs received wildcards into the doubles main draw:
  Félix Auger-Aliassime /  Denis Shapovalov
  Daniel Nestor /  Vasek Pospisil

The following pairs received entry as alternates:
  Jérémy Chardy /  Lucas Pouille
  Sam Querrey /  Rajeev Ram
  Artem Sitak /  Stefanos Tsitsipas

Withdrawals
Before the tournament
  Chung Hyeon
  Fabio Fognini
  Dominic Thiem

WTA singles main-draw entrants

Seeds

 1 Rankings are as of July 30, 2018

Other entrants
The following players received wild cards into the main singles draw:
  Françoise Abanda 
  Victoria Azarenka  
  Eugenie Bouchard
  Serena Williams
  Carol Zhao

The following players received entry from the singles qualifying draw:
  Ana Bogdan 
  Katie Boulter
  Caroline Dolehide
  Kirsten Flipkens
  Sesil Karatantcheva
  Barbora Krejčíková
  Christina McHale
  Monica Niculescu
  Lucie Šafářová
  Carla Suárez Navarro
  Wang Qiang 
  Sofya Zhuk

The following player received entry as an alternate:
  Tatjana Maria

The following player received entry as a lucky loser:
  Monica Puig

Withdrawals
Before the tournament
  Dominika Cibulková → replaced by  Aryna Sabalenka
  Madison Keys → replaced by  Alison Van Uytvanck
  Garbiñe Muguruza → replaced by  Monica Puig
  CoCo Vandeweghe → replaced by  Sorana Cîrstea
  Serena Williams → replaced by  Tatjana Maria

Retirements
  Mihaela Buzărnescu
  Lesia Tsurenko

WTA doubles main-draw entrants

Seeds

 Rankings are as of July 30, 2018

Other entrants
The following pairs received wildcards into the doubles main draw:
  Françoise Abanda /  Tatjana Maria 
  Eugenie Bouchard /  Sloane Stephens 
  Carson Branstine /  Rebecca Marino

Withdrawals
Before the tournament
  Mihaela Buzărnescu

During the tournament
  Karolína Plíšková
  Yang Zhaoxuan
  Zhang Shuai

Finals

Men's singles

  Rafael Nadal defeated  Stefanos Tsitsipas, 6–2, 7–6(7–4)

Women's singles

  Simona Halep defeated  Sloane Stephens, 7–6(8–6), 3–6, 6–4

Men's doubles

  Henri Kontinen /  John Peers defeated  Raven Klaasen /  Michael Venus, 6–2, 6–7(7–9), [10–6]

Women's doubles

  Ashleigh Barty /  Demi Schuurs defeated  Latisha Chan /  Ekaterina Makarova, 4–6, 6–3, [10–8]

References

External links
Official website - Men's tournament
Official website - Women's tournament

 
2018 ATP World Tour
2018 WTA Tour
2018 in Canadian tennis
2018
August 2018 sports events in Canada